Emma M. Baegl (1896–1998) was an American painter and educator. She taught at the University of Nebraska–Lincoln and the Lincoln Arts Guild. Her work can be seen at the Museum of Nebraska Art.

References

1896 births
1998 deaths
Artists from Lincoln, Nebraska
School of the Art Institute of Chicago alumni
American women painters
Painters from Nebraska
20th-century American painters
20th-century American women artists